Mariaella is a genus of air-breathing land slugs, a terrestrial pulmonate gastropod mollusks in the family Ariophantidae.

Species from genus Mariaella are also pests on vanilla.<ref>Mavinkurve R. G., Shanbhag S. P. & Madhyastha N. A. 2004. [http://www.zoosprint.org/ZooPrintJournal/2004/November/1684-1686.pdf Checklist of terrestrial gastropods of Karnataka, India]. Zoos' Print Journal 19(11):1684-1686.</ref>

 Species 
Species in the genus Mariaella include:
 Mariaella beddomei (Godwin-Austen, 1888)
 Mariaella dussumieri (Gray, 1855) - type species

 Distribution 
India.

Western Ghats, from Mahableshwar southwards, and hill-country of Ceylon.

 Shell description 
The shell is internal, solid, ovate, convex above, flatly concave beneath, with a small apex, not coiled, lying on the right side as seen from about near the end.

 Anatomy 
The animal very similar to that of Girasia, but the lobes of the mantle united into an oval shield, tricarinate above and completely covering the shell, only a small pinhole-like orifice near the posterior end being left open. From this small orifice a distinct line or cicatrix runs to the pneumostome (the respiratory aperture) on the right side, marking the dividing line of the right and left shell-lobes. The mantle extends forward over the neck, but not behind the shield, which is sunk behind in a depression of the back. The body behind the shield is sharply keeled above and terminates in a large mucous pore. Peripodial groove distinct as usual, but narrow, and sole tripartite longitudinally.

Genitalia and odontophore much resembling those of Girasia. From Girasia the present genus is separated by its almost imperforate shield, the more solid shell of different form, and by several small distinctions in the genitalia.

Reproductive system: The dart-sac is long and cylindrical. There is a large swelling of the free oviduct (ovitheca) just beyond the point where the vas deferens is given off. The spermatheca is rather irregularly ovate, and increases in size when containing numerous spermatophores. The penis is provided with a small kalc-sac and gives off a short caecum. The retractor muscle is attached to 
the bend.

The radula has a broad band of wider median teeth, tricuspid as a rule, and these pass into bicuspid outer laterals, with the two cusps subequal and terminal as in Girasia''.

References
The article incorporates public domain text from the reference.

Ariophantidae
Taxa named by John Edward Gray